is a Japanese four-panel manga series written and illustrated by Coolkyousinnjya. It has been serialized in Houbunsha's Manga Time Original magazine since April 2012. An anime television series adaptation by Artland aired from October to December 2015.

Characters

A fourteen-year-old girl who, for some reason, can't turn down any request given to her. Her best friends are Megumi and Masako. It has been hinted that she may have a small crush on Kuro.

Shuri's friend since elementary school, who is often lazy and overly-reliant on her.

Shuri's friend since middle school, who is somewhat cynical.

A teen boy who becomes Shuri's classmate in the third year. He wants to be relied on but is often ignored.

Media

Manga
The manga, written and illustrated by Coolkyousinnjya, began serialization in Houbunsha's Manga Time Original in April 2012. Ten tankōbon volumes have been released .

Anime
An anime television adaptation by Artland aired from October to December 2015. The series is directed by Kenichi Imaizumi and written by Yuka Suguro, with character design by Yurie Kuniyuki and music by Arte Refact. The anime is streamed worldwide by Crunchyroll.

Episode list

See also
 I Can't Understand What My Husband Is Saying, a series by the same author
 Miss Kobayashi's Dragon Maid, another series by the same author

References

External links
  at Manga Time Original 
  
 

Artland (company)
Houbunsha manga
Seinen manga
2015 anime television series debuts
Yonkoma